.38 caliber is a frequently used name for the caliber of firearms and firearm cartridges.

The .38 is considered a large firearm cartridge; anything larger than .32 is considered a large caliber. Before 1990, the standard sidearms of police in the United States were revolvers that fired the .38 Special cartridge, seconded by revolvers firing the .357 Magnum, a lengthened version of the .38 Special.

Handgun cartridge table

{| class="wikitable sortable" style="text-align:left"
|-
! Cartridge name || Bulletdiameter || Caselength || Cartridgelength || Type || class="unsortable"|Source
|-
|.380 ACP||  ||  ||  || Rimless || Barnes 1997, p. 274
|-
|.38 Casull||  ||  || – || Rimless || 
|-
|.38 Short Colt||  ||  ||  || Rimmed || Barnes 1997, p. 274
|-
|.38 Long Colt||  ||  ||  || Rimmed || Barnes 1997, p. 274
|-
|.38 Special||  ||  ||  || Rimmed || Barnes 1997, p. 274
|-
|.38 ACP||  ||  ||  || Semi-rimmed || Barnes 1997, p. 274
|-
|.38 Super||  ||  ||  || Semi-rimmed || Barnes 1997, p. 274
|-
|.38 Super Comp||  ||  ||  || Rimless || Starline cartridge dimensions
|-
|.38 S&W||  ||  ||  || Rimmed || Barnes 1997, p. 274
|-
|.380 Revolver Short||  ||  ||  || Rimmed || Barnes 1997, p. 274
|-
|.380 Revolver Long||  ||  ||  || Rimmed || Barnes 1997, p. 274
|-
|.38-40 Winchester||  ||  ||  || Rimmed || Barnes 1997, p. 92
|-
|}

See also
9 mm caliber
38 (disambiguation)

References

Pistol and rifle cartridges